Pawelka is a German language surname. It stems from the male given name Pavel – and may refer to:
Joseph Pawelka (1887–?), New Zealand criminal and prison escaper
Rudi Pawelka (1940), German politician

References 

German-language surnames
Surnames from given names